Yateri-ye Pain (also Romanized as Yāterī-ye Pā’īn and Yātrī Pā’īn; also known as Yāterīābād-e Soflá) is a village in Yateri Rural District, in the Central District of Aradan County, Semnan Province, Iran. At the 2006 census, its population was 178, in 47 families.

References 

Populated places in Aradan County